DCCU may refer to:

 Dane County Credit Union, a full service financial cooperative based in Madison, Wisconsin, United States
 Delta Community Credit Union, a savings and loans co-operative in Georgia, United States
 District of Canterbury Credit Union, a former savings and loans co-operative in the United Kingdom
 The reporting mark for containers from Dow Corning Corporation
 DC Extended Universe or DC Cinematic Universe, a shared fictional universe of films and TV series developed by DC Studios